Otto Torvik (12 June 1901 – 8 April 1988) was a Norwegian missionary in Xinjiang and in India. He founded the Norwegian Missionary Muhammad Mission (Den Norske Muhammedanermisjon) in 1940. Today, the name is changed to Christian Muslim Mission (Kristen Muslimmisjon).

Biography
Otto Torvik was born at Romsdal in Bolsøy parish just east of Molde, Norway. His father, Ingebrigt Taraldsen from Torvik in Romsdal, was a farmer and lay preacher. His mother was sick when  Torvik was born, and she prayed that his son would to be used in the service of God.
He attended   Rauma Folkehøgskole in Molde, where Torvik first heard of the overseas missions. The missionary call grew in him and he continued to study at Fjellhaug Internasjonale Høgskole in Oslo which was run by the Norwegian Lutheran China Mission Association.  Torvik was awarded with a  Master of theology by  Augsburg Seminary (now Augsburg University) in Minneapolis, Minnesota. He also studied at Hartford Seminary in Hartford, Connecticut and was ordained in 1946.

In 1931, Torvik traveled to Chinese Turkistan to see if it was possible to start with a Christian mission there. In 1940 he founded the Norwegian Missionary Muhammad Mission (now  Kristen Muslimmisjon). Torvik was a central role at the Mission serving as Secretary General between 1958 and 1966. Eight years later in 1948, Torvik traveled to India as a pioneer missionary. He built a mission station at Sajinipara  in West Bengal  which was the mission's first field mission in India.

Personal life
Otto Torvik was married to Helene Wiebe  (1908-1979), the descendant of Dutch and German immigrants, whom he  met in Kyrgyzstan. In his later years, he and his family resided in Norway. He died during 1988. Both he and his wife were buried at Grorud kirkegård in Oslo.

Authorship 
 1939 - Guds medarbeidere (published by Misjonskurset på Fjellhaug. new edition in 1986)
 1939 - Mellom Muhammedanere (Bergen. new edition 1946)
 1940 and 1942 -  Abdulla Jan  (Bergen)
 1945 - Bak Himalaya (Bergen)
 1961 - Muhammedanermisjon (Oslo)
 1967 -  Blant muhammedanere i India (Stavanger)
 1971 -  Frelse og ansvar (prekensamling)  (Stavanger)
 1981 - Helene fra Kirgisistan (Oslo)
 Article in Misjonshuset i Bergen (by A. Tangeraas,  Oslo, 1945 p. 300-314)
 A series of articles in the magazine Lys over land

References

External links
Kristen Muslimmisjon (KMM) website

Related reading
 Nils Bloch-Hoell (1954) Muhammad ideamission   
 Jens Christensen (1959) Islam  
 Torben Christensen (1957) En kirke blir til
 Nils Dybdal-Holthe (1976) På troens veier. Torviks 75-årsdag
 Nils Dybdal-Holthe (1989) På Jesu bud. NMM 50 år 
 Olav Hodne (1967) The seed bore fruit : a short history of the Santal Mission of the Northern churches 1867-1967
 Gunnar Melbø (1951) Krigerprofeten: Islams grunnlegger 
 O. G. Myklebust  (1949) Muhammedanismen som misjonsproblem
 Geir Valle (1973) Religionene og kristen misjon

1988 deaths
1901 births
People from Møre og Romsdal
Augsburg University alumni
Hartford Seminary alumni
Lutheran missionaries in China
Norwegian Lutheran missionaries
Norwegian expatriates in China
Norwegian expatriates in India
Lutheran missionaries in India
20th-century Lutherans